David Clifford (Irish: Daithí Ó Clúmháin) (born 22 January 1999) is an Irish Gaelic footballer who plays as a corner-forward or full-forward at club level for Fossa and East Kerry and for the Kerry county team. He is regarded as one of the best players in the game.

Underage career

Schools
Clifford first came to prominence when he scored 2–05 in the Hogan Cup final 2016 as St Brendan's College, Killarney saw off St Patrick's College, Maghera to deliver their first title in 24 years.

Soccer
In addition to Gaelic football, Clifford also played underage soccer, as a centre-half. The future professional English Football League players Shane McLoughlin and Dara O'Shea alongside future musician Ryan Meaney were his opponents at under-age level.

Minor
Clifford made his debut on the inter-county scene at the age of sixteen when he was selected for the Kerry minor team. He enjoyed two championship seasons with the minor team and won back-to-back Munster and All-Ireland medals in 2016 and 2017. He was captain of the 2017 winning teams scoring 6–27 in six games, including 4–04 in the All-Ireland final win over Derry. He ended the 2017 season as the Minor Footballer of the Year.

Club

Fossa GAA

Clifford is a member of the Fossa club situated just outside Killarney. They currently compete in the Kerry Intermediate Football Championship.

Kerry, Munster & All-Ireland Junior Wins
A week after his first All-Ireland win with Kerry, Clifford scored 1-9 versus  Listowel Emmets. In his second match of the 2022 club championship, he again scored 1-9 versus  Castlegregory. In their third group match he scored 0-10 against Listry. Against Annascaul in the quarter final he scored 1-6 in Fossa’s victory. In their semi final win over Ardfert, he contributed 0-9 of their 0-14 total. The Junior Premier final brought Fossa and Listry together again. In Fossa’s 4-15 to 0-22 win, Clifford scored an incredible 2-12.

Fossa went on to win the 2022 Munster Junior club football championship. Clifford scoring 0-04 (0-02f) versus  Feohanagh-Castlemahon (Limerick) and 0-10 (0-07f) in the final versus Kilmurry (Cork).

In the All-Ireland series Clifford scored 0-07 (0-01f) in the semi final versus Castletown from Meath.

He guided Fossa to their first All-Ireland Junior win in a man of the match performance versus Stewartstown Harps GFC. He scored 0-11 (0-03f) and was sent off in the dying moments  having received a second yellow card.

East Kerry

Clifford plays with East Kerry at both underage and senior level.

At underage level he won two Kerry Minor Football Championship titles in 2016 and 2017. He won a Kerry Under-21 Football Championship title in 2018.

He later lined out in the Kerry Senior Football Championship with the divisional side. He is two time county champion, winning the 2019 Kerry Senior Football Championship and the 2020 Kerry Senior Football Championship. 

In 2019 he scored 1-6 in the quarter final, 0-9 in the semi final and 1-3 in the final. 

In 2020 he scored 1-5 in the quarter final and 1-4 in the final.  

In 2021, a straight knock out championship was in place. Clifford scored 0-2 as East Kerry lost to eventual champions Austin Stacks.

Clifford made his 2022 debut as a substitute in the win against Spa. He scored 0-3 after being introduced in the 40th minute. He scored 0-7 in the  quarter final versus Kenmare Shamrocks. He won his third Kerry Senior Football Championship beating Mid Kerry in the final, scoring 1-9 in the process.

Kerry

2018
Clifford made his senior debut during the 2018 National Football League. 

He won his first Munster Senior Football Championship title later that summer after over coming Clare (0-2) and then Cork (0-2) in the final. 

Kerry failed to progress from their Super 8’s group stage. Clifford scoring 1-5 against Galway, 1-3 against Monaghan and 2-6 against Kildare.

He ended the year with an All Star and as All Stars Young Footballer of the Year.

2019
In 2019, Clifford again won the Munster Senior Football Championship with Kerry, scoring 0-3 in the semi final versus Clare and scoring 0-4 in the final versus Cork.

In the Super 8 quarter final group stage, Clifford scored 0-7 against Mayo, 0-3 against Donegal and was rested against Meath. He scored 0-5 in the semi final against Tyrone.

Kerry went on to reach the All-Ireland senior final versus Dublin. Clifford scored 0-2 in the drawn match and 0-5 in the replay, as Dublin ran out 1-18 to 0-15 winners.

He ended the year with an All Star.

2020
Clifford was selected as Kerry captain due to the Kerry Senior Football Championship being won by his East Kerry side.

Kerry won the  2020 National Football League after winning 5 of their 7 matches. This was Clifford’s first national league title. 

Clifford scored 0-4 in the shock Munster Senior Football Championship semi final loss to Cork. The 2020 championship was straight knock-out and as such was his only championship game that year.

2021
He scored a hat-trick against Galway in the opening round of the 2021 National Football League. Kerry would go on to share the National League title with Dublin this year delivering Clifford his second league title.

He won his third Munster Senior Football Championship defeating Clare (1-6), Tipperary (1-2) and Cork (0-1).

Kerry reached the All-Ireland semi final in which they faced Tyrone. Clifford scored 0-8 on the day, however, due to injury he could not take part in extra-time. Tyrone ran out winners 3-14 to 0-22.

He ended the year with an All Star.

2022
Clifford won his third National League to start the inter county season. In the final versus Mayo he scored 1-6, 1-5 from play. 

His fourth Munster championship arrived in 2022. In the semi final he scored 0-4 however, injury prevented Clifford from playing in the final versus Limerick.

The All-Ireland quarter final versus Mayo saw Clifford return from injury. He scored 1-3 in the win. A semi final win over Dublin was secured on the back of his 0-6.

Clifford scored 0-8 in the 2022 All-Ireland Senior Football Championship Final and in the process won his first All-Ireland Senior Football Championship. He was chosen as man of the match due to his performance.

He won his fourth All Star and was selected as All Stars Footballer of the Year and The Sunday Game Footballer of the Year.

2023
He made his season debut as a second half substitute in Kerry’s round 3 league match against Mayo.

All-Ireland Final scores

Personal life
Clifford and his girlfriend Shauna O'Connor have one son,Óigí, born in September 2021.

His brother Paudie Clifford is also a member of the Kerry team and a fellow All-Ireland winner.

He studied in Institute of Technology, Tralee and graduated with a degree in health and leisure.
In August 2022, he graduated with a Masters in PE teaching at the University of Limerick.

He has worked alongside Shane Enright for the Bank of Ireland, where he was hired for the summer in 2018. 
Clifford is a teacher in his alma mater St Brendan's College, Killarney. 

He supports Celtic.

Career statistics

Club

Division

College

Inter-county

Championship appearances

Honours
St Brendan's College
 Hogan Cup (1): 2016
 Corn Uí Mhuirí (1): 2016

Fossa
All-Ireland Junior Club Football Championship (1): 2023 
Munster Junior Club Football Championship (1): 2022
Kerry Premier Junior Football Championship (1): 2022

East Kerry
Kerry Senior Football Championship (3): 2019, 2020, 2022
Kerry Under-21 Football Championship (1): 2018
Kerry Minor Football Championship (2): 2016, 2017

Kerry
 All-Ireland Senior Football Championship (1): 2022
 Munster Senior Football Championship (4): 2018, 2019, 2021, 2022
 National Football League (3): 2020 (c), 2021 (jc), 2022
 All-Ireland Minor Football Championship (2): 2016, 2017 (c)
 Munster Minor Football Championship (2): 2016, 2017 (c)
 McGrath Cup (1): 2022

Individual
All Star (4): 2018, 2019, 2021, 2022
All Stars Footballer of the Year (1): 2022
All Stars Young Footballer of the Year (1): 2018
GAA Minor Star Footballer of the Year: 2017
Minor All-Star Award (1): 2017
All-Ireland Senior Football Championship Final Man of the Match (1): 2022
The Sunday Game Team of the Year (3): 2018, 2021, 2022
The Sunday Game Footballer of the Year (1): 2022
Higher Education Rising Star Footballer of the Year (1): 2022
Sigerson Cup Team of the Year (1): 2022

References

1999 births
Living people
All Stars Awards winners (football)
Association football defenders
Bank of Ireland people
East Kerry Gaelic footballers
Fossa Gaelic footballers
Gaelic footballers who switched code
Gaelic football forwards
Kerry inter-county Gaelic footballers
People educated at St Brendan's College, Killarney
Republic of Ireland association footballers